Avrainville is the name of three communes in France:
 Avrainville, Meurthe-et-Moselle
 Avrainville, Vosges
 Avrainville, Essonne